Tobiáš Diviš (born 2 December 2003) is a Slovak footballer who plays for MFK Tatran Liptovský Mikuláš as a right-back.

Club career

MFK Tatran Liptovský Mikuláš
Diviš made his professional debut for MFK Tatran Liptovský Mikuláš against FK Senica on 16 April 2022.

References

External links
 MFK Tatran Liptovský Mikuláš official club profile 
 
 
 Futbalnet profile 

2003 births
Living people
Slovak footballers
Association football defenders
MFK Ružomberok players
MFK Tatran Liptovský Mikuláš players
2. Liga (Slovakia) players
Slovak Super Liga players
Sportspeople from Ružomberok